Ambition Musik (Hangul: 앰비션뮤직) is a South Korean hip-hop label founded by rappers Dok2 and The Quiett on September 29, 2016.

History 
The label was founded on September 29, 2016, under Illionaire Records with artists Keem Hyo-eun, Changmo, and Hash Swan. As Illionaire Records was widely known for its three-member lineup—Dok2, The Quiett, Beenzino—the company decided a sub-label would be more fit than signing artists under the mother label.

On June 11, 2019, producer Way Ched, who worked with many artists including Sik-K, Punchnello, and Simon Dominic, joined as a new member with the news of his first full-length album "COMFY", which was released at 6 p.m. on June 14.

On June 18, 2019, Leellamarz was signed with the news of his full-length album "MARZ 2 AMBITION," which was released at 6 p.m. on the June 21st.

On 18 July 2019, the label signed Zene The Zilla, a member of the YTC4LYF Crew.

After a fruitful year of artist albums and compilations, AMBITION MUSIK was selected as the "Label of the Year" at the 2020 Korea Hip-Hop Awards.

After Beenzino's departure from the label, parent company Illionaire Records disbanded on July 6, 2020. Ambition Musik announced it would continue as an independent label.

On November 25, 2020, The Quiett founded Daytona Entertainment with fellow rapper Yumdda. He remains CEO of Ambition Musik, though not an artist under the label.

On October 13, 2021, the label announces Don Malik as a new artist. 

On March 22, 2022, the label announces Paul Blanco as a new artist.

Artists 
 Keem Hyo-eun
 Changmo
 Hash Swan
 Ash Island
 Way Ched
 Leellamarz
 Zene The Zilla
 Don Malik
 Paul Blanco

References

South Korean hip hop record labels